These are the official results of the Women's 100 metres hurdles event at the 1994 European Championships in Helsinki, Finland, held at Helsinki Olympic Stadium on 8 and 9 August 1994.

Medalists

Results

Final
9 August
Wind: -1.7 m/s

Semi-finals
9 August

Semi-final 1
Wind: -0.4 m/s

Semi-final 2
Wind: -1.9 m/s

Heats
8 August

Heat 1
Wind: 1.1 m/s

Heat 2
Wind: 0.8 m/s

Heat 3
Wind: -0.6 m/s

Heat 4
Wind: 0.2 m/s

Participation
According to an unofficial count, 27 athletes from 18 countries participated in the event.  The announced athlete from  did not show.

 (1)
 (1)
 (2)
 (2)
 (3)
 (1)
 (1)
 (1)
 (1)
 (1)
 (2)
 (1)
 (3)
 (1)
 (1)
 (1)
 (1)
 (3)

See also
 1990 Women's European Championships 100m Hurdles (Split)
 1991 Women's World Championships 100m Hurdles (Tokyo)
 1992 Women's Olympic 100m Hurdles (Barcelona)
 1993 Women's World Championships 100m Hurdles (Stuttgart)
 1995 Women's World Championships 100m Hurdles (Gothenburg)
 1996 Women's Olympic 100m Hurdles (Atlanta)
 1997 Women's World Championships 100m Hurdles (Athens)
 1998 Women's European Championships 100m Hurdles (Budapest)

References

 Results

Hurdles 100
Sprint hurdles at the European Athletics Championships
1994 in women's athletics